Ellen Cullen McCormack (September 15, 1926 – March 27, 2011) was an American politician who was a candidate for the Democratic presidential nomination in 1976.

Early life

On September 15, 1926, Eleanor Rose Cullen was born in The Bronx borough of New York City, to Irish immigrants William and Ellen Cullen. In 1949, she married Francis J. McCormack, after meeting him at a dance, and had four children with him.

Career

On July 14, 1975, McCormack filed with the Federal Election Commission to run in the 1976 presidential primary, and formally announced her candidacy at a news conference in Boston, Massachusetts, on November 16. She was the first woman to receive federal matching funds, which she received $244,125 in, and appeared on the ballot in twenty states. She ran on an exclusively pro-life platform, and won no primaries, but had her name placed into nomination and received 22 votes from delegates at the 1976 Democratic National Convention, and engaged in a debate that also included future President Jimmy Carter.

During the 1980 presidential election, she ran as the presidential nominee of the New York State Right to Life Party, with Carroll Driscoll as her running mate. They received 32,327 votes.

She had been a chairwoman of the New York Right to Life Party, and was their candidate for Lieutenant Governor of New York in 1978.

Later life

On March 27, 2011, she died in an assisted-living facility in Avon, Connecticut, after a long period with a heart ailment which originated during one of her pregnancies.

References

1926 births
2011 deaths
Candidates in the 1976 United States presidential election
Candidates in the 1980 United States presidential election
20th-century American politicians
Female candidates for President of the United States
New York State Right to Life Party politicians
People from the Bronx
American anti-abortion activists
People from Long Island
Activists from New York (state)
20th-century American women politicians
21st-century American women